Hellfire (J. T. Slade) is a fictional character appearing in American comic books published by Marvel Comics.

Hellfire was portrayed by Axle Whitehead, in the TV series Agents of S.H.I.E.L.D. in the third and fourth seasons.

Publication history 

Hellfire first appeared in The Mighty Avengers #13 and was created by Brian Michael Bendis and Alex Maleev.

Fictional character biography 
Nick Fury recruits Carter Slade's grandson, James Taylor James (also known as J. T. Slade), introduced in The Mighty Avengers #13, to be part of Fury's team against the "Secret Invasion" of the shape-shifting alien Skrulls. The character roll call at the beginning of Secret Invasion #4 (Sept. 2008) refers to J. T. as "Hellfire". Hellfire goes on to make numerous appearances in the ongoing series, Secret Warriors. He is later revealed to be a HYDRA double agent.

Nick Fury allows Hellfire to fall to his death as a result of the character's double dealings.

Powers and abilities 
Slade has superhuman reflexes and the ability to cause a chain to ignite in flame and cause massive damage.

In other media 
J. T. James appears in Agents of S.H.I.E.L.D., portrayed by Axle Whitehead. This version is an Inhuman demolitions expert and former mercenary. First appearing in the episode "Paradise Lost", Daisy Johnson and Lincoln Campbell seek him out for a Kree device in his possession. In the episode "The Singularity", James joins forces with Hive and goes through Terrigenesis, receiving the power to ignite objects and make them explode on contact. James continues to work with Hive until he is defeated by Melinda May in the episode "Ascension". As of the episode "Let Me Stand Next to Your Fire", he has taken up work at a fireworks store and sold out his fellow Inhumans to the Watchdogs before he is defeated by Robbie Reyes and taken into S.H.I.E.L.D. custody.

References

External links 
 Hellfire at Marvel Wiki
 Hellfire at Comic Vine
 Hellfire at Marvel Cinematic Universe

Characters created by Brian Michael Bendis
Fictional characters with fire or heat abilities
Hydra (comics) agents
Marvel Comics superheroes
Marvel Comics supervillains